Hafod y Llyn is a halt in North Wales on the Welsh Highland Railway, located between  and . It had been a halt, with a siding for a period on the original WHR, and a temporary terminus during the rebuilding of the line.

However, being a convenient place for a loop during the rebuild, construction of a small platform (with no other facilities) was undertaken during 2009. For a short space of time it was to be called Hen Hafod, but local representation convinced the idea to be dropped

The station opened to passenger traffic on 21 May 2009 and was the WHR's southern terminus. As the station has no parking or other passenger facilities, only self-sufficient walkers and cyclists could board or alight there.

Hafod y Llyn closed on 26 May 2010, when the next section of line to Pont Croesor opened. From January to March, 2011, trains ran to Hafod y Llyn from Porthmadog as part of the Winter Warmer services. This replaced the similar service on the Ffestiniog line to Trwyn-y-garnedd, which was suspended due to the bypass construction work at Minffordd. Still occasionally used such as in March 2017 when it appeared in the timetable.

References  

Heritage railway stations in Gwynedd
Welsh Highland Railway
Beddgelert